Saint Thamel and companions (died 125 AD) are a group of 2nd century Christian martyrs. Thamel was a priest for a pagan god who was converted to Christianity. He was killed with his sister during the persecutions of Christians under the Roman emperor Hadrian.

Notes

125 deaths
Converts to Christianity from pagan religions
Italian saints
2nd-century Christian martyrs
Year of birth unknown